The key town of Hoopstad is situated at the intersection of the R34, R59 & R700 in the Free State Province. This area is considered to be the richest maize-producing district in South Africa. The town is located near the Bloemhof Dam which is situated on the Vaal River. The Sandveld Nature Reserve is positioned alongside the Bloemhof Dam. Hopetown and Hoopstad are two different towns and are often confused.

History and activities
The town of Hoopstad was initially founded in 1876 and named Hauptstad after Mr Haupt, a surveyor. The translation of Hauptstad into Afrikaans means Capital, which it clearly wasn't and the town was therefore renamed Hoopstad. The town, whose name means "Hope City" in Afrikaans, was established on the one side of the large farm Kameeldoorns, with another town Bultfontein on the other side.

References

Populated places in the Tswelopele Local Municipality
Populated places established in 1873